Paradrillia convexiuscula is a species of sea snail, a marine gastropod mollusk in the family Horaiclavidae.

Description

Distribution
This marine species occurs off Japan.

References

 Shuto, Tsugio. "Conacean gastropods from the Miyazaki group." Memoirs of the Faculty of Science, Kyushu University Ser. D Geology 11.2 (1961).

convexiuscula
Gastropods described in 1961